Miriam Gallagher (born 1940) was an Irish playwright and author whose works have been performed globally and translated into numerous languages.

Biography
Born Born Miriam O’Connor in Waterford to Michael O’Connor, a bank manager with 5 children including Valerie, Michael and Fidelma. She went to college in both the University of London and University College Dublin. After college Gallagher worked initially as a speech and language therapist, an occupation which led to the publication of one of her non fiction books. Gallagher also studied drama in London, in LAMDA under Frieda Hodgson.

She was commissioned to write essays for The Irish Times, Irish Medical Times and journals. Gallagher took up writing screenplays and stage plays. The result is a prolific list of productions which have been staged around the world as well as broadcast by RTÉ and the BBC.

Her varied work from play to speech therapy, as well as working with prisoners, and led her to be a visiting lecturer at universities across the globe. Gallagher was deeply involved in the organisations of her craft, leading her to being a member of Irish PEN, both on its committee and as vice president, on the Irish Writers' Union committee as well as a council member of the Society of Irish Playwrights. Over the years she won a number of awards.

Her husband was Gerhardt Gallagher. They lived in Dublin and had children Mia, Donnacha and Etain. In 2012 Gallagher was diagnosed with cancer and kidney disease and she died in 2018.

Awards

 Arts Council and European Script Fund Awards.
 MHA TV Script Award
 EU Theatre Award
 Writer's Exchange to Finland
 In 2006 The Parting Glass was a prizewinner of an international playwrighting competition
 In 2008 Doracha Mór agus Seoltóirí Ghaoth Dobhair won best script
 She has presented work at Semaine Mondiale des Auteurs Vivants de Théâtre in Marseilles

Works

Film and screenplays
  Gypsies
  Girls in Silk Kimonos

Commissions
 The Ring of Mont de Balison (Ranelagh Millennium Project)
 Kalahari Blues (Galloglass Theatre Co)
 The Gold of Tradaree (Clare Co. Council)
 The Mighty Oak of Riverwood (Betty Ann Norton Theatre School)
 Fancy Footwork (Dublin Theatre Festival)

Collected plays
 Fancy Footwork(Soc. Irish Playwrights, 1997, 2nd Ed.)
 Kalahari Blues(Mirage, 2006)
 The Gold of Tradaree (Mirage, 2008)
 Green Rain~ Irish Composers on Stage(Mirage, 2011)
 A Wasteland Harvest (Mirage, 2014)

Books and story collections
 Song for Salamander (2004, Trafford)
 Let's Help Our Children Talk (1977, Dublin O’Brien Press)
 Pusakis at Paros & Other Stories (Trafford 2008)
 Night in Havana & Other Stories (Dublin, Mirage 2017)

References

External links 
 Home Page
 Public Art Commissions
 List of plays by Miriam Gallagher

 

Irish women novelists
Irish women dramatists and playwrights
People from Waterford (city)
1940 births
2018 deaths
20th-century Irish dramatists and playwrights
21st-century Irish novelists
21st-century Irish dramatists and playwrights
20th-century Irish women writers
21st-century Irish women writers